Marios Stylianou (born 23 September 1993) is a Cypriot international footballer who plays for Anorthosis, as a right back.

Career
Stylianou has played club football for Apollon Limassol, Anorthosis, Omonia and Karmiotissa.

He made his international debut for Cyprus in 2014.

References

1993 births
Living people
Cypriot footballers
Cyprus international footballers
Association football fullbacks
Apollon Limassol FC players
Anorthosis Famagusta F.C. players
AC Omonia players
Karmiotissa FC players
Cypriot First Division players